Baseball is a bat-and-ball sport played between two teams, usually of 25 players each.

Baseball may also refer to:

Games and sports 
 Baseball (ball), the ball used in baseball
 British baseball, game played in a few parts of Britain
 Vintage base ball, a sport using 19th-century baseball rules
 Baseball (card game), a card game published by Ed-U-Cards
 Baseball (drinking game), a game using ping-pong balls and cups of beer
 Baseball (poker), a variety of stud poker
 Baseball (1971 video game), a mainframe computer game
 Baseball (1977 video game), a video game for RCA Studio II
 Baseball (Intellivision video game), from 1980
 Baseball (1983 video game), a video game by Nintendo
 Home Run (video game), or Baseball, a 1978 game for the Atari 2600
 RealSports Baseball, or simply Baseball, a 1983 game for the Atari 2600 and other Atari platforms
 Pesäpallo, a variation of baseball played in Finland

Music 
 Baseball (band), an independent band from Melbourne, Australia
 The Baseballs, a German rockabilly band
 Baseball: An Album by Sayanything, a 2001 album by Say Anything

Other uses 
 Baseball (TV series), a 1994 documentary series by Ken Burns
 Baseball (bomb), an unsuccessful type of bouncing bomb, intended for use by Royal Navy attack boats in place of torpedoes

See also
 
 :Category:Baseball